The 2012 Internazionali di Monza e Brianza was a professional tennis tournament played on clay courts. It was the eighth edition of the tournament which was part of the 2012 ATP Challenger Tour. It took place in Monza, Italy between 11 and 17 June 2012.

ATP entrants

Seeds

 1 Rankings are as of May 28, 2012.

Other entrants
The following players received wildcards into the singles main draw:
  Andrea Arnaboldi
  Edoardo Eremin
  Alessio di Mauro
  Filippo Volandri

The following players received entry as a special exempt into the singles main draw:
  Alejandro González

The following players received entry from the qualifying draw:
  Antonio Comporto
  Nicolás Pastor
  Boris Pašanski
  Walter Trusendi

Champions

Singles

 Daniel Gimeno Traver def.  Albert Montañés, 6–2, 4–6, 6–4

Doubles

 Andrey Golubev /  Yuri Schukin def.  Teymuraz Gabashvili /  Stefano Ianni, 7–6(7–4), 5–7, [10–7]

External links
Official website

Internazionali di Monza e Brianza
Internazionali di Monza E Brianza